Robert Gambill (born March 31, 1955 in Indianapolis) is an opera singer (Heldentenor).

Biography 
Gambill studied mathematics at Purdue University (1973-1976) before becoming an exchange student at Hamburg University in Germany, where he added German studies to his curriculum. He enrolled at the Hochschule für Musik und Theater in Hamburg where he studied voice with Prof. Hans Kagel. At 25 he made his La Scala debut in the leading role of Michael in the world premiere of Karlheinz Stockhausen's Donnerstag aus Licht, directed by Luca Ronconi.

He remained in Europe, and in 1984 joined the ensemble of the Zurich Opera in Switzerland. For three years he sang the leading lyric and belcanto tenor roles in operas such as Don Giovanni, The Magic Flute, The Barber of Seville and Die Lustigen Weiber von Windsor. His international career kicked off after he sang the role of Lindoro in Rossini's The Italian Girl in Algiers in 1987, directed by Michael Hampe.

It was followed by engagements at the leading European and international opera houses including the Vienna State Opera, the Royal Opera Covent Garden in London, the Opera in Paris, the Munich State Opera and the Metropolitan Opera in New York.

In 1995, he successfully made the change into the dramatic German repertoire. He studied with Prof. Irmgard Hartmann-Dressler and was quickly recognized with appearances as Painter in Berg's Lulu at the Salzburg Festival and Narraboth in Strauss' Salome at both the Stuttgart State Opera and London's Royal Opera House. He continued as a Heldentenor with acclaimed and ongoing performances as Wagner's Tannhäuser, Tristan, Siegmund and Parsifal on opera and concert stages around the world.

He sang the heroic tenor parts under the baton of important conductors such as Riccardo Muti, Daniel Barenboim, Claudio Abbado, Wolfgang Sawallisch, Giuseppe Sinopoli, Simon Rattle or Zubin Mehta at the opera houses in New York, London, Paris, San Francisco, Chicago, Berlin, Munich, Vienna, Milan as well as at Carnegie Hall and at the festivals in Salzburg (Easter & Summer), Aix-en-Provence, Tanglewood, Glyndebourne and many others.

Teaching 

2006 Robert Gambill became a Professor at the Universität der Künste (UdK) in Berlin.

Discography LP/CD 
Donnerstag aus Licht, Stockhausen, DGG 1979
Stabat Mater, Gioacchino Rossini, Catherine Malfitano, Agnes Baltsa, Robert Gambill, Gwynne Howell; Riccardo Muti, EMI 1981
Acis und Galatea, Händel/Mozart, Edith Mathis, Anthony Rolf Johnson, Robert Gambill, Robert Lloyd: Peter Schreier, Orfeo 1982
Manon Lescaut, Giacomo Puccini, Mirella Freni, Plácido Domingo, Renato Bruson, Kurt Rydl, Robert Gambill: Giuseppe Sinopoli, DGG 1984
Der Messias, Georg Friedrich Händel, Lucia Popp, Brigette Fassbender, Robert Gambill, Robert Holl: Neville Marriner, EMI 1984
Les Ballets Russe, Vol. 6, Igor Stravinsky, "Pulcinella", Arleen Auger, Robert Gambill, Gerolf Scheder: Christopher Hogwood, HÄNSSLER CLASSIC 1985
Paradis und die Peri, Robert Schumann, Edith Wiens, Ann Gjevang, Robert Gambill: Armin Jordan, ERATO 1988
Fierrabras, Franz Schubert, Robert Holl, Karita Mattila, Thomas Hampson, Laszlo Polgar, Josef Protschka, Cheryl Studer: Claudia Abbado, DGG 1988
Les Pèlerins de la Mecque, Christoph Willibald Gluck, Robert Gambill, Julie Kaufmann, Iris Vermillion, Ulrich Ress, Jan-Hendrik Rootering: Leopold Hager, ORFEO 1991
Die Entführung aus dem Serail, W. A. Mozart, Cheryl Studer, Elżbieta Szmytka, Kurt Streit, Robert Gambill, Günther Missenhardt: Bruno Weil, Sony 1992
Messa di Gloria, Gioacchino Rossini, Anna Caterina Antonacci, Bernadette Manca di Nissa, Francisco Araiza, Robert Gambill, Pietro Spagnoli: Salvatore Accardo, RICCORDI, 1992
Die Jahreszeiten, Joseph Haydn, Ruth Ziesak, Robert Gambill, Alfred Muff: Wolfgang Sawallisch, Hänssler Classic 1994
Cleopatra & Cesare, Carl Heinrich Graun, Janet Williams, Iris Vermillion, Lynne Dawson, Robert Gambill, Ralf Papkin, Jeffrey Francis,: René Jacobs, HARMONIA MUNDI, 1996
„Fieber“, Franz Lehár, Robert Gambill: Klauspeter Seibel, CPO 1996
Moses, Max Bruch, Michael Volle, Robert Gambill: Claus Peter Flor, ORFEO 1999
Die Walküre, Richard Wagner, Robert Gambill, Angela Denoke, Attila Jung, Renate Behle, Ticina Vaughn, Jan-Hendrik Rootering: Lothar Zagrosek, NAXOS 2003
The Nine Symphonies, Ludwig van Beethoven, "Symphony No. 9", Soile Isokoski, Rosemarie Lang, Robert Gambill, Renè Pape: Daniel Barenboim, TELDEC 2004
Sinfonie Nr. 8, Gustav Mahler, Sylvia Greenberg, Lynne Dawson, Robert Gambill, Detlef Roth, Jan-Hendrik Rootering: Kent Nagano, HARMONIA MUNDI 2005
Idomeneo, W.A. Mozart/ Richard Strauss Fassung, Robert Gambill, Britta Stallmeister, Camilla Nylund, Iris Vermillion: Fabio Luisi, ORFEO 2007

DVD 

L‘italiana in Algieri, Gioacchino Rossini, Günther von Kannen, Nuccia Focile, Robert Gambill, Doris Soffel, Enric Serra: Ralf Weikert/Michael Hampe, ARTHAUS 1987
L‘occasione fa il ladro, Gioacchino Rossini, Susan Patterson, Robert Gambill, Natale de Carolis, Monica Bacelli: Ganluigi Gelmetti/Machael Hampe, EUROARTS 1992
Salome, Richard Strauss, Catherine Malfitano, Bryn Terfel, Kenneth Riegel, Anja Silja, Robert Gambill: Christoph von Dohnányi/Luc Bondy, DECCA 1997
Die Walküre, Richard Wagner, Robert Gambill, Angela Denoke, Attila Jung, Renate Behle, Ticina Vaughn, Jan-Hendrik Rootering: Lothar Zagrosek/Christoph Nel, EUROARTS 2003
Tristan und Isolde, Richard Wagner, Nina Stemme, Robert Gambill, Katarina Karnéus, Bo Skovhus, René Pape: Jirí Belohlávek/Nikolaus Lehnhoff, OPUSARTE, 2008 
Die Walküre, Richard Wagner, Robert Gambill, Eva-Maria Westbroek, Mikhail Petrenko, Eva Johansson, Lilli Paasikivi, Willard White: Simon Rattle/Stéphane Braunschweig, BELAIR CLASSIQUES 2008
Tannhäuser, Richard Wagner, Robert Gambill, Camilla Nylund, Waltraud Meier, Roman Trekel, Stephen Milling: Philippe Jordan/Nikolaus Lehnhoff, ARTHAUS 2008
Elektra, Richard Strauss, Iréne Theorin, Waltraud Meier, Eva-Maria Westbroeck, Robert Gambill, René Pape: Daniele Gatti/Nikolaus Lehnhoff, ARTHAUS 2010

References 

Jens F. Laurson, Seen and Heard International, May 7, 2012
Julia Spinola, Frankfurter Allgemeine Zeitung, August 10, 2010
Stefan Schmöe, Online Musik Magazin, May 7, 2009
Enrique Sacau, Mundoclasico.com, February 25, 2009
Georg-Friedrich Kühn, Neue Zürcher Zeitung, April 21, 2010
Joachim Lange, Frankfurter Rundschau, April 22, 2010
Markus Thiel, Münchner Merkur, August 9, 2010
Paul Griffiths, The New York Times, December 19, 2000
Jean-Louis Validire, L'éclat du Philharmonique de Berlin, Le Figaro, July 2, 2007
Alan Riding, Adding a Roof Raises the Ceiling for a French Festival's Ambitions, The New York Times, July 5, 2007
Valerie Scher, Looking beyond composer's dark shadow, The San Diego Union Tribune, January 21, 2008
Rupert Christiansen, Tristan and Isolde make for a perfect night of Wagner at Glyndebourne, The Telegraph, August 3, 2007
Chris Mullins, Opera Today, August 23, 2009

Living people
1955 births
American opera singers
Musicians from Indianapolis
Singers from Indiana
Classical musicians from Indiana